Anthicus heroicus is a species of antlike flower beetle in the family Anthicidae. It is found in North America.

References

Further reading

 
 

Anthicidae
Articles created by Qbugbot
Beetles described in 1895